The 1998 Richmond Spiders football team represented the University of Richmond during the 1998 NCAA Division I-AA football season. It was the program's 115th season and they finished as Atlantic 10 Conference (A-10) champions after posting a 7–1 record in conference play. The Spiders earned a berth as the #3 seed into the 16-team Division I-AA playoffs, but were upset in the first round to 14-seed Lehigh, 23–24. Richmond was led by fourth-year head coach Jim Reid.

Schedule

Awards and honors
First Team All-America – Marc Megna (Walter Camp, The Sports Network, Associated Press)
Second Team All-America – Winston October (The Sports Network)
First Team All-Atlantic 10 – Eric King, Marc Megna, Paris Lenon, Winston October
Second Team All-Atlantic 10 – Chris Anderson, Joe Douglas
Third Team All-Atlantic 10 – Eric Beatty, Mac Jahney, Jasper Pendergrass
Atlantic 10 Defensive Player of the Year – Marc Megna
Atlantic 10 Coach of the Year – Jim Reid

References

Richmond
Richmond Spiders football seasons
Atlantic 10 Conference football champion seasons
Richmond Spiders football